Lasers in Medical Science is a bimonthly peer-reviewed medical journal covering laser medicine. It was established in 1986 and is published by Springer Science+Business Media. It is the official journal of Sociedad Española de Láser Médico Quirúrgico, the British Medical Laser Association, the International Academy for Laser Medicine and Surgery, the European Laser Association (ELA), and the World Academy for Laser Education in Dentistry. The editor-in-chief is Keyvan Nouri (University of Miami). According to the Journal Citation Reports, the journal has a 2020 impact factor of 3.161.

References

External links

Laser medicine
Medical physics journals
Springer Science+Business Media academic journals
Publications established in 1986
Bimonthly journals
English-language journals